The Prior of Canonbie was the head of the Augustinian monastic community of Canonbie Priory, in Dumfries and Galloway. The priors are badly documented and few are known. The following is a list of priors who are known:

 William, 1296
 John de Jedburgh
 [?] Graham, fl. 1494
 [?] Graham, fl. 1532
 John Graham, fl. 1540
 George Graham, fl. 1540
 James Oliver, fl. 1576

Notes

Bibliography
 Watt, D.E.R. & Shead, N.F. (eds.), The Heads of Religious Houses in Scotland from the 12th to the 16th Centuries, The Scottish Records Society, New Series, Volume 24, (Edinburgh, 2001), pp. 28–9

See also
 Canonbie Priory

Canonbie
Canonbie
History of Dumfries and Galloway